This is a list of notable Black Canadians, inclusive of multiracial people who are of partially Black African descent.

A
Elamin Abdelmahmoud, CBC Radio host
Wayne Adams, first black MLA in Nova Scotia, Liberal 
Lovell Adams-Gray, actor
Oluniké Adeliyi, actress
Alfons Adetuyi, film director and producer
Robert Adetuyi, film director and screenwriter
Randell Adjei, poet
Ohenewa Akuffo, wrestler
AHI, singer-songwriter
Zanana Akande, former Ontario Member of Provincial Parliament and cabinet minister
Philip Akin, director
Lincoln Alexander, first black Member of Parliament in Canada, former Lieutenant Governor of Ontario 
Toya Alexis, R&B/pop singer and Canadian Idol season 1 finalist
Aisha Alfa, actress and comedian
Ismaila Alfa, radio host
Thom Allison, actor
Jean Alfred, first black Canadian member of the National Assembly of Quebec
Lillian Allen, dub poet
Archie Alleyne, jazz musician
a l l i e, R&B singer
David Amber, sportscaster
Kimora Amour, drag entertainer
Ammoye, reggae singer
Prince Amponsah, actor
Aba Amuquandoh, comedian
Anastarzia Anaquway, drag entertainer
Ezzrett Anderson, CFL player
Granville Anderson, politician
"Hollywood Jade" Anderson, dancer and choreographer
Osborne Perry Anderson, resident of the Chatham-Kent area; involved in the raid at Harper's Ferry
Ricky Anderson, athlete and writer
Shamier Anderson, actor
Virnetta Anderson, first Black Canadian city councillor in Calgary
Jill Andrew, politician
Marie-Joseph Angélique, executed for setting fire to Montreal
Dominique Anglade, politician
Georges Anglade, academic
Joel Anthony, NBA basketball player with the Detroit Pistons
Tafari Anthony, rhythm and blues singer
Trey Anthony, playwright (Da Kink in My Hair)
Océane Aqua-Black, drag entertainer
Bromley Armstrong, community activist
Christine Armstrong, film editor
Tré Armstrong, actress and choreographer
Uzoma Asagwara, politician
Brandon Ash-Mohammed, stand-up comedian
Ryad Assani-Razaki, writer
James Atebe, politician
Yvonne Atwell, Nova Scotia's first black female MLA, NDP
Jean Augustine, former Member of Parliament, black Canadian Cabinet Minister, former deputy Speaker of the House of Commons
Edem Awumey, writer
Malcolm Azania, writer and activist

B
B-Kool, rapper
Clark Backo, actress
Njacko Backo, musician
Backxwash, rapper
Cameron Bailey, film critic and artistic director of the Toronto International Film Festival
Donovan Bailey, first Canadian to win an Olympic gold medal in the 100m sprint (1996 Atlanta)
James Baley, musician and dancer
Tynomi Banks, drag entertainer
Barbada de Barbades, drag entertainer
Vivian Barbot, Bloc Québécois member of parliament for the riding of Papineau
Emery Barnes, first black Speaker of the British Columbia Legislative Assembly and CFL defensive end
RJ Barrett, NBA player with the New York Knicks
Rowan Barrett, former professional basketball player
Daniel Bartholomew-Poyser, conductor
Angèle Bassolé-Ouédraogo, poet
Frank Baylis, politician
Gary Beals, pop singer and Canadian Idol season 1 first runner-up
Jacqueline Beaugé-Rosier, writer
Kettly Beauregard, politician
Shawn Belle, NHL prospect
Frantz Benjamin, Montreal city councillor 
Anthony Bennett, NBA player (first overall pick in the 2013 NBA draft)
Cle Bennett, actor
Tyrone Benskin, actor and director; Member of Parliament; national vice president of ACTRA
Wanda Thomas Bernard, social work, educator, senator
Rima Berns-McGown, politician 
Lisa Berry, actress
Ardon Bess, actor (Trailer Park Boys, King of Kensington)
Carrie Best, activist and humanitarian, first black journalist
James Calbert Best, diplomat and public servant
Margarett Best, Ontario Member of Provincial Parliament and Cabinet Minister
Salome Bey, jazz, blues and gospel singer (US citizen, Canadian permanent resident)
Tim Biakabutuka, former NFL player
Henry Bibb, author and abolitionist
Bertrand Bickersteth, writer
Charlie Biddle (Sr.), one of Canada's greatest bassists
Sonya Biddle, actress and politician
Jully Black, R&B/pop singer
Lindsay Blackett, Member of the Legislative Assembly of Alberta, the province's first black cabinet minister
Shane Book, writer
Walter Borden, actor and playwright
Boslen, rapper
Cory Bowles, actor (Trailer Park Boys)
Jeffrey Bowyer-Chapman, actor
George Boyd, playwright
David Bradford, peot
Lawrence Ytzhak Braithwaite, dub poet and novelist
Dionne Brand, author
Fred Brathwaite, NHL goalie
Leonard Braithwaite, politician
Rella Braithwaite, historian and journalist
Wendy Motion Brathwaite, writer and musician
Garnet Brooks, opera singer
Phyllis Simmons Brooks, educator
Shelton Brooks, popular music and jazz singer, songwriter, and pianist and vaudeville and musical theatre performer who wrote some of the biggest hits of the first third of the 20th century
Aisha Brown, actress and comedian
Divine Brown, R&B/soul singer and musical theatre performer
Denham Brown, professional basketball player in Europe
Luther Brown, dancer and choreographer
Rosemary Brown, British Columbia legislator; first black woman to run for the leadership of a political party in Canada (the federal New Democratic Party)
Measha Brueggergosman, opera singer
Kim Brunhuber, journalist and writer
Matthew Bullock, fugitive from the US who became a cause celebre in the 1920s
Millicent Burgess, educator
Nate Burleson, NFL player
Tajon Buchanan, soccer player
Sharon Burey, senator

C
Dayana Cadeau, professional bodybuilder
Cadence Weapon, rapper
Madwa-Nika Cadet, politician
Daniel Caesar, R&B and soul singer
Celina Caesar-Chavannes, politician
Shawna Cain, Christian R&B singer
Herb Carnegie, star of Quebec professional hockey league
Anson Carter, NHL star
Rubin Carter, former boxer and activist
Jazz Cartier, rapper
Demo Cates, musician
Mary Anne Chambers, former Ontario Member of Provincial Parliament and cabinet minister
Myriam J. A. Chancy, writer
Keshia Chanté, R&B singer and co-host of BET's 106 & Park
David Chariandy, writer
Gregory Charles, pop and gospel singer
Nuela Charles, singer
Tanika Charles, soul and rhythm and blues singer
Charmaine, rapper
Sean Cheesman, dancer and choreographer
Ulrick Chérubin, mayor of Amos, Quebec, one of the first black mayors of any city in Quebec
Jojo Chintoh, longtime Citytv reporter
Ify Chiwetelu, CBC Radio host
Choclair, rapper
Rae Dawn Chong, actress (The Color Purple)
Jillian Christmas, poet
Jarvis Church, singer (The Philosopher Kings and solo) and music producer (Nelly Furtado)
Clairmont the Second, rapper
Austin Clarke, novelist (The Polished Hoe, Growing Up Stupid Under the Union Jack)
Cheril N. Clarke, writer
George Elliott Clarke, poet and playwright (Whylah Falls, George and Rue) 
Kevin Clarke, activist and politician
Michèle Pearson Clarke, writer
Edith Clayton, basket maker
Bernadette Clement, mayor of Cornwall, Ontario
Sebastian Clovis, Canadian Football League player and HGTV host
Tristan Clovis, Canadian Football League player
Devon Clunis, chief of Winnipeg Police Service and Canada's first black Canadian chief of police
Caroline Cole, vice-president, Business Development Bank of Canada
Desmond Cole, journalist
Lucretia Newman Coleman, writer
Donté Colley, dancer
Wayde Compton, poet
Anne Cools, Canada's first black senator
Afua Cooper, poet and historian
Amanda Cordner, actress
Lisa Michelle Cornelius, actress
Michael Coteau, Ontario Member of Provincial Parliament
Arisa Cox, television personality
Deborah Cox, R&B singer
Archie Crail, writer
Laura Creavalle, professional bodybuilder
Roger Cross, actor (24)
Alcenya Crowley, educator and activist
Vera Cudjoe, actress, producer, and educator; founder of Black Theatre Canada
Alvin Curling, Ontario Member of Provincial Parliament and Speaker of the Legislature of Ontario
Ayesha Curry, celebrity chef and television personality

D
Ola Dada, stand-up comedian
Samuel Dalembert, NBA player
Trevor Daley, NHL player with the Dallas Stars
Jonathan David, professional footballer for Lille OSC
Alphonso Davies, professional footballer for FC Bayern Munich
Delos Davis, third black lawyer in Canada and first black King's Counsel in the UK
Hubert Davis, Academy Award-nominated documentary filmmaker
Rob Davis, former York and Toronto city councillor
Nigel Dawes, NHL player with the New York Rangers
Desirée Dawson, musician
Buddy Daye, former boxer and activist in Nova Scotia
Jonathan de Guzman, soccer player
Julian De Guzman, soccer player
Dwayne De Rosario
David Defiagbon, boxer
Simone Denny, house music vocalist
Viola Desmond, beautician and civil rights activist, first Canadian woman to be depicted on Canadian currency
Robert Nathaniel Dett, composer
Rita Deverell, broadcaster and journalist, founder of Vision TV
Devon, hip-hop musician ("Mr. Metro")
Alpha Yaya Diallo, musician
Paul Dillett, retired IFBB bodybuilder and businessman
George Dixon, first black world boxing champion in any weight class  
Fefe Dobson, pop punk singer
Shirley Dorismond, politician
James Douglas, early governor of Vancouver Island and British Columbia
James W. Douglas, British Columbia MLA
Orville Lloyd Douglas, poet, writer, and journalist
Stan Douglas, installation artist
Zabrina Douglas, comedian
Nathan Downer, television journalist
Nigel Downer, actor and comedian
Ray Downey, former boxer who medalled in the 1988 Olympics
Riele Downs, actress 
Drake, rapper and actor (Degrassi: The Next Generation)
Dream Warriors, hip hop duo
Dwight Drummond, television journalist
Ali Duale, politician
Christian Dubé, politician
Emmanuel Dubourg, Quebec Liberal Party MNA for Viau
Rob Ducey, former Major League Baseball player
Alison Duke, film producer
Arlene Duncan, actress, singer (Little Mosque on the Prairie)

E
Chuck Ealey, Canadian Football League player
Gordon Earle, former NDP Member of Parliament for Halifax West
Amatoritsero Ede, writer
Rosey Edeh, ET Canada reporter and former MSNBC meteorologist
Aida Edemariam, writer
Esi Edugyan, novelist
Phil Edwards, track athlete
Tyrone Edwards, television host
Efajemue, jazz percussionist
Francesca Ekwuyasi, writer and artist
Jade Elektra, drag performer and HIV/AIDS educator
Natasha Eloi, science reporter for Space channel
Emanuel, rhythm and blues singer 
Ray Emery, NHL goalie
Jonathan Emile, poet, composer and entrepreneur
Tyler Ennis, NBA player with the Phoenix Suns
Robert Esmie, Olympic gold medalist 4x100 relay (Atlanta 1996)
Gérard Étienne, writer
Karena Evans, director
Irdens Exantus, actor

F
Famous, rapper
Perdita Felicien, track athlete
Greg Fergus, politician
Dominique Fils-Aimé, blues, jazz and rhythm and blues singer
Melanie Fiona, R&B singer
Farley Flex, music promoter and Canadian Idol judge
Cheryl Foggo, writer
Melyssa Ford, professional model and actress
Rose Fortune, first female police officer in Canada
Cecil Foster, novelist and sociologist and biologist
Rick Fox, NBA player
Angelique Francis, blues singer
Mayann Francis, former Lieutenant Governor of Nova Scotia and former director and CEO of the Nova Scotia Human Rights Commission
Fil Fraser, writer
Grant Fuhr, Hockey Hall of Fame goaltender (Edmonton Oilers), first black hockey player to win the Stanley Cup 
Kelly Fyffe-Marshall, writer and filmmaker

G
Matt Galloway, CBC Radio host
Harry Gairey, community activist
Robyn Gayle, former soccer player
Kendall Gender, drag entertainer
Mifflin Wistar Gibbs, merchant and member of Victoria City Council in the 1860s
Chantal Gibson, poet
Glenroy Gilbert, Olympic gold medalist 4x100 relay (Atlanta 1996)
Shai Gilgeous-Alexander – NBA player
Malcolm Gladwell, journalist
George Godfrey, former boxer originally from Prince Edward Island
Patrice Goodman, actress
Gary Goodridge, former mixed martial artist and kickboxer
Kamala-Jean Gopie, activist and political candidate
Audrey Gordon, politician
Stephen Gough, Nova Scotia MLA
Dirk Graham, first NHL captain of African descent
Jean-Luc Grand-Pierre, former NHL defenseman, currently playing in Europe
Anais Granofsky, actor (Degrassi)
Marlene Green, community activist, educator, and NGO field worker
Matthew Green, politician
Robert Joseph Greene, writer
Stanley G. Grizzle, judge, community activist

H
Wes Hall, businessman and Dragons' Den investor
William Hall, first Nova Scotian, third Canadian and first black person to be awarded the Victoria Cross
Quancetia Hamilton, actress
Sherman Hamilton, basketball player and sportscaster
Kevin Hanchard, actor
Suzy Hansen, politician
Adrian Harewood, CBC Radio journalist and host
Winnie Harlow, model
Alicia K. Harris, filmmaker
Faisal Hassan, politician 
Haviah Mighty, rapper
Wilson A. Head, sociologist and human rights activist
Akeel Henry, record producer
Violet King Henry, first black female lawyer in Canada
Josiah Henson, former slave, believed to have been the inspiration for the novel Uncle Tom's Cabin
Dan Hill, pop singer-songwriter
Daniel G. Hill, sociologist and first head of the Ontario Human Rights Commission
Lawrence Hill, novelist and memoirist
Darryl Hinds, actor and comedian
Penny Hodge, activist
Mark Holden, actor (Cyberpunk 2077, Captain Phillips, Deep State)
Adrian Holmes, actor
Jennifer Holness, film and television writer and producer
Nicole Holness, singer and broadcaster
Charmaine Hooper, soccer player; retired as leader in appearances and goals for the women's national team
Nalo Hopkinson, science fiction author
Jennifer Hosten, Canadian High Commissioner to Grenada and diplomat
Frederick Langdon Hubbard, chair of the Toronto Transit Commission
William Peyton Hubbard, former Toronto alderman, controller and acting mayor
Jada Shada Hudson, drag entertainer
Kimberly Huie, actress
Mitzie Hunter, politician
Nate Husser, rapper
Atiba Hutchinson, professional footballer for Besiktas J.K.
 Junior Hoilett

I
Israel Idonije, defensive end for the NFL's Chicago Bears
Marci Ien, politician, former CTV News journalist
Daniel Igali, Olympic gold medalist in wrestling (Sydney 2000)
Jarome Iginla, Hockey Hall of Fame inductee, NHL All-Star and Olympic gold medalist (Salt Lake 2002, Vancouver 2010)
Tony Ince, politician
Orin Isaacs, bandleader (Open Mike with Mike Bullard, The Mike Bullard Show), musician and music producer
Tajja Isen, actress/singer (Atomic Betty)
Ayisha Issa, actress
Richard Iton, academic and writer

J
John Henry Jackson, football player and restaurateur
Ovid Jackson, former Member of Parliament and former mayor of Owen Sound
Sammy Jackson, jazz and rhythm and blues singer
Angela James, professional hockey player and Hockey Hall of Fame inductee
Stephan James, actor
Yolande James, Quebec Minister of Immigration and Cultural Communities
Yazmeen Jamieson, professional soccer player
Sterling Jarvis, actor and musician
Yves Jarvis, musician
Michaëlle Jean, former broadcaster and former Governor General of Canada, the first mixed race person in Canadian history appointed to that position
Schelby Jean-Baptiste, actress
Jelleestone, rapper 
Jemeni, singer and broadcaster
Ferguson Jenkins, baseball star and first Canadian elected to the (US) Baseball Hall of Fame
Jean Augustine, first black Canadian politicians
Marlene Jennings, politician
Harry Jerome, sprinter and first Canadian to hold an official track and field world record
Aisha Sasha John, writer
Lyndon John X, reggae musician
Ben Johnson, Olympic sprinter disqualified in 1988 drug scandal
Chris Johnson, boxer
Clark Johnson, actor (Homicide: Life on the Street)
Hal Johnson, television health and fitness personality
Kirk Johnson, boxer
Louisa Ann Johnson, merchant and church supporter
Molly Johnson, rock and jazz vocalist
Rocky Johnson, professional wrestler
Taborah Johnson, singer, actor and radio broadcaster
Denham Jolly, broadcast executive
El Jones, writer
Mark Jones, sportscaster for ESPN and ABC
Oliver Jones, jazz pianist
Paul Jones, sportscaster and Toronto Raptors radio play-by-play voice
Rocky Jones, politician and activist
Spider Jones, journalist and former boxer
Clifton Joseph, poet and broadcaster
Cory Joseph, NBA player
David Joseph, basketball coach and former college player
Devoe Joseph, professional basketball player
Akiel Julien, actor
Junia-T, rapper
Marie-Ève Juste, film director

K
K-Anthony, gospel singer
K'Naan, hip-hop musician and singer
k-os, hip-hop musician
Adria Kain, R&B singer
Evander Kane, professional ice hockey player
Tommy Kane, former NFL wide receiver
KAPRI, dance/pop singer
Arielle Kayabaga, politician
Kaytranada, musician
Marlon Kazadi, actor
Hisham Kelati, comedian
Kaie Kellough, writer
Janaya Khan, activist
Kiara (Dimitri Nana-Côté), drag entertainer
Rawlson King, municipal politician in Ottawa
Nam Kiwanuka, television host and journalist
Maka Kotto, author and actor from Quebec elected to Canadian Parliament in 2004 (Bloc Québécois)
Pierre Kwenders, musician

L
Sonnet L'Abbé, poet and critic
Dany Laferrière, writer, elected to the Académie française
Artis Lane, sculptor and artist
Sam Langford, former boxer
Georges Laraque, NHL player
Tobi Lark, jazz, blues and gospel singer
Cyle Larin, professional footballer playing for Besiktas J.K.
Mélissa Laveaux, musician
Olivier Le Jeune, believed to have been the first slave purchased in what later became Quebec
Karen LeBlanc, actress
Didier Leclair, writer
Ranee Lee, jazz singer
Michael Lee-Chin, business leader
Marie-Évelyne Lessard, actress
Sandra Levy, Olympic field hockey player
Alan Shane Lewis, comedian and television host
Andrea Lewis, actress (Degrassi: The Next Generation)
Daurene Lewis, first black woman mayor in North America
Glenn Lewis, R&B singer
Lennox Lewis, professional boxer (Olympic gold medallist and three-time heavyweight champion)
Leslyn Lewis, politician
Ray Lewis, first Canadian-born black person to win a medal in the Olympics
Sharon Lewis, journalist
Murray Lightburn, rock singer-songwriter (The Dears)
Laura Mae Lindo, politician
Little X, director
Rich London, rapper
Gilson Lubin, comedian
Canisia Lubrin, writer
Nicole Lyn, actress

M
Kaycee Madu, Alberta MLA
Maestro, hip-hop musician, first Canadian rapper to have a Top 40 hit in Canada
Jamaal Magloire, NBA player
Atlee Mahorn, sprinter
Ahdri Zhina Mandiela, director
Egerton Marcus, boxer
Amanda Marshall, pop singer-songwriter
Mike Marson, second black player in NHL history
Lesra Martin, crown attorney and speaker; in his youth was involved in freeing Rubin Carter
Russell Martin, MLB player
Boman "Bomanizer" Martinez-Reid, comedian and social media content creator
Beverly Mascoll, entrepreneur and community leader
Marie-Sœurette Mathieu, writer
Yasmine Mathurin, documentary filmmaker
Denise Matthews, former model, actress and lead singer of Vanity 6 turned evangelist
Rueben Mayes, former NFL player
Robyn Maynard, writer
Suzette Mayr, writer
Alexis Mazurin, CBC Radio host
Melchior Mbonimpa, writer
Tawiah M'carthy, writer and actor
Trent McClellan, comedian
Kandyse McClure, actress (Battlestar Galactica)
Elijah McCoy, origin of "the real McCoy", inventor
Howard McCurdy, Member of Parliament, first black male to run for the leadership of a political party (the federal New Democratic Party)
Jay W. McGee, musician
Yanna McIntosh, actress
Tony McKegney, NHL player
Berend McKenzie, writer
Katherine McKittrick, writer
Mark McKoy, Olympic gold medalist 110 m hurdles (Barcelona 1992)
Brandon Jay McLaren, actor (Power Rangers S.P.D.)
Kairo McLean, reggae musician
Tessa McWatt, novelist
Stella Meghie, film director and screenwriter
Marie-Françoise Mégie, politician
Traci Melchor, television personality
Don Meredith, politician
Mentallo, professional wrestler
Nega Mezlekia, writer
Kim Katrin Milan, writer
Myst Milano, musician
Rollie Miles, CFL player
Shadrach Minkins, American-born fugitive slave rescued from federal custody in Boston in 1851 who settled in Montreal
Chris Moise, Toronto city councillor
Moka Only, rapper of the Swollen Members
Firmin Monestime, mayor of Mattawa, Ontario; first black mayor in Canada
Andrew Moodie, actor and playwright
Tanya Moodie, actress based in the United Kingdom
Roger Mooking, chef
Tracy Moore, journalist
Annmarie Morais, writer
Carlos Morgan, R&B/soul singer
Dwayne Morgan, spoken word artist
Vanessa Morgan, actress and singer (from Ottawa)
Amber Morley, Toronto city councillor
MorMor, musician
Paul S. Morton, pastor of St. Stephen Baptist Church in New Orleans, a church with over 20,000 members
Jamie Moses, politician
Aaron Albert Mossell, first black person to graduate from the University of Pennsylvania Law School
Nathan Francis Mossell, first black person to graduate from the University of Pennsylvania Medical School
Joseph Motiki, television host
Thamela Mpumlwana, actor
Sheila Murray, writer
Téa Mutonji, writer
Jamaal Myers, Toronto city councillor

N
Blaise Ndala, writer
Haydain Neale, R&B/soul singer (Jacksoul)
Ray Neufeld, former NHL player
Kathleen Newman-Bremang, writer and broadcaster
Carlos Newton, former mixed martial artist (UFC Welterweight Champion)
Andrew Nicholson, NBA player
Cecily Nicholson, poet
Darnell Nurse, NHL player
Kia Nurse, professional basketball player
Richard Nurse, former CFL player

O
Samuel Oghale Oboh, first person of African descent to be President of the 110-year old Royal Architectural Institute of Canada
OBUXUM, musician and record producer
David Nandi Odhiambo, writer
Charles Officer, film director
Kardinal Offishall, rapper
Lana Ogilvie, fashion model/TV hostess
Thomas Antony Olajide, actor
Donald Oliver, first black senator from Nova Scotia
Tolu Oloruntoba, poet
Willie O'Ree, first black hockey player in the National Hockey League
Gabriel Osson, writer
Milton Ottey, world champion high jumper
Ouri, electronic musician and DJ

P
Brenda Paris, activist and politician
John Paris Jr., hockey coach
Percy Paris, politician
Stuart Parker, leader of the Green Party of British Columbia 1993 to 2000
Amanda Parris, broadcaster and writer
PartyNextDoor, R&B singer
Annamie Paul, politician, leader of the Green Party of Canada, the first black leader of a federal party in Canada
Michaela Pereira, journalist
Kayla Perrin, writer
Oscar Peterson, jazz pianist
Anthony Phelps, Haitian-Canadian writer
M. NourbeSe Philip, poet, novelist and essayist
Abu Ameenah Bilal Philips, Islamic scholar and founder of the Islamic Online University
Joseph Jomo Pierre, actor and playwright
Carmine Pierre-Dufour, filmmaker (Mahalia Melts in the Rain, Fanmi)
Shailyn Pierre-Dixon, actress
Burr Plato, town councillor for Niagara Falls (1886-1901)
Juliette Powell, television host, first black Miss Canada (1989)
Rev. Richard Preston, anti-slavery activist and founder of African Baptist Association of Nova Scotia
Prevail, rapper of the Swollen Members
Althea Prince, writer
Garth Prince, children's entertainer
Dwayne Provo, Canadian Football League player
 Jaime Peters

Q
Quanteisha, R&B singer
Quddus, MTV VJ

R
Rob Rainford, chef
Micheline Rawlins, first black woman appointed to the Ontario Court of Justice
Savannah Ré, singer
Pokey Reddick, Stanley Cup champion, Edmonton Oilers goalie
Zalika Reid-Benta, writer
Gloria Reuben, actress (ER)
Cabbie Richards, radio personality
Cara Ricketts, actress
Jayde Riviere, soccer player
Jackie Richardson, jazz, blues and gospel singer
Jael Richardson, writer
Kim Richardson, pop, jazz, blues and gospel singer
Bill Riley, third black player in NHL history
Charles Roach, Canadian civil rights lawyer; activist in the black community in Toronto; had many contributions to the wider community in Toronto, including being one of the founders of what was known as Caribana in 1967
Karen Robinson, actress
Kenny Robinson, stand-up comedian, TV host 
Percy Rodriguez, actor
George Rogers, former mayor of Leduc, Alberta, current MLA for the riding of Leduc-Beaumont-Devon
Michelle Ross, drag entertainer
Ronnie Rowe, actor
RT!, director
Calvin Ruck, senator
Donovan "Razor" Ruddock, professional boxer

S
Shakura S'Aida, jazz and blues singer
Rodney Saint-Éloi, poet
Kwasi Songui, actor
Beverley Salmon, politician
Liselle Sambury, writer
Samito, musician
Lance "Aquakultre" Sampson, soul and R&B musician
Robert Edison Sandiford, writer
Sarahmée, rapper
Yolanda Sargeant, soul singer
Mairuth Sarsfield, novelist
SATE, rock singer
Charles R. Saunders, writer
John Saunders, sports journalist for ESPN and ABC
Mark Saunders, chief of the Toronto Police Service
Alison Sealy-Smith, actress
Djanet Sears, playwright
Sagine Sémajuste, actress
Olive Senior, poet and short story writer
Shad, hip hop musician
Mary Ann Shadd, first female newspaper publisher
Jackie Shane, R&B singer
Tony Sharpe, sprinter
Lisa Shaw, house and R&B/soul singer
David Shepherd, politician
Anthony Sherwood, actor
Simisola Shittu (born 1999), British-born Canadian basketball player for Ironi Ness Ziona of the Israeli Basketball Premier League
Liberty Silver, R&B and jazz singer
Makeda Silvera, novelist
Angela Simmonds, politician
Wayne Simmonds, NHL player for the Toronto Maple Leafs
Denis Simpson, actor and children's television host
Dylan Sinclair, rhythm and blues singer
Eon Sinclair, bassist (Bedouin Soundclash)
Shawn Singleton, actor/musician
Zal Sissokho, musician
Slakah the Beatchild, soul/R&B singer and record producer
Makyla Smith, actress
So Sus, electronic musician
Frances-Anne Solomon, film producer, director, distributor
Spek Won, rapper
Chris Spence, director of education of the Hamilton-Wentworth District School Board and then the Toronto District School Board, previously a CFL running back
Tony "Wild T" Springer, blues rock guitarist
Donna-Michelle St. Bernard, theatre director and playwright
Benjamin St-Juste, American football player
Paul Stalteri
Erroll Starr, musician
Gavin Stephens, comedian
Ordena Stephens-Thompson, actress
Anthony Stewart, NHL player with the Florida Panthers
Jordan Subban, professional ice hockey defenceman
Malcolm Subban, professional ice hockey goaltender
P. K. Subban, NHL ice hockey defenceman
Cree Summer, actress, singer, and comedian
Bruny Surin, Olympic gold medalist 4x100 relay (1996 Atlanta)
David (Sudz) Sutherland, director
Robert Sutherland, first black lawyer in Canada
Michelle Sweeney, jazz and blues singer
Sylvia Sweeney, television broadcaster and former basketball player

T
Tamia, R&B singer and actress
Tasha the Amazon, rapper
Bobby Taylor and his band, The Vancouvers, a popular Motown act who were instrumental in getting The Jackson 5 signed to the label and produced the earliest Jackson 5 records
Dione Taylor, jazz singer
Julian Taylor, rock musician (Staggered Crossing)
Tamara Taylor, actress (Bones)
Angella Taylor-Issajenko, sprinter
Tebey, country and pop songwriter and singer
Angeline Tetteh-Wayoe, radio personality
Michael Thompson, current Toronto city councillor
Tristan Thompson, NBA player
Thrust, rapper
TiKA, R&B singer
Tizzo, rapper
Töme, reggae musician
Asha Tomlinson, journalist
Thyrone Tommy, filmmaker
Tory Lanez, hip hop musician
Yanic Truesdale, actor (Gilmore Girls)
Kreesha Turner, R&B singer

U
Louise Uwacu, writer

V
Vanity, performer
Kevin Vidal, comedian and actor
Christian Vincent, actor (Noah's Arc)
Jon Vinyl, R&B/soul singer
Nerene Virgin, CBC anchor of Saturday Report, Newsworld, Newsworld International, co-star of Today's Special
Clement Virgo, director

W
Rinaldo Walcott, professor and Canada Research Chair at OISE/University of Toronto
Abraham Beverley Walker, first Canadian-born black lawyer
Carol Wall, social activist and labour leader
Dwight Walton, former Team Canada Basketball player
Joel Ward, NHL player
John Ware, former slave, Alberta cowboy
Syrus Marcus Ware, artist, activist and professor
Damian Warner, Olympian
Mark Warner, lawyer and politician
Jackie Washington, blues musician
Bahia Watson, actress and playwright
Benjamin Charles Watson, actor
Dawn Tyler Watson, blues singer
The Weeknd, R&B singer-songwriter
Kevin Weekes, NHL goalie
Wesli, musician
Juanita Westmoreland-Traoré, first appointed black judge in the history of Quebec
Bill White, musician and political candidate
Jack White, union activist
Portia White, gospel singer
William A. White, only black officer of the No. 2 Construction Battalion
Dwight Whylie, journalist
Andrew Wiggins, NBA player with the Golden State Warriors
Aileen Williams, activist and founding member of the Canadian Women's Negro Association (CANEWA)
Charmaine Williams, politician
Desai Williams, sprinter
Genelle Williams, actress
Ian Williams, poet and novelist
Michael Williams, MuchMusic VJ
Nigel Shawn Williams, actor
Odario Williams, broadcaster and musician
Stephen Williams, director
Tonya Lee Williams, longtime actress on The Young and the Restless
Trevor C. Williams, former Team Canada Basketball player
Tyrone Williams, former CFL and NFL wide receiver
Nigel Wilson, baseball player (first draft pick by the Florida Marlins, 2nd overall, in the 1992 Expansion Draft)
Paul Winn, human rights activist, director of Canadian Race Relations Foundation, former television personality
Mary Matilda Winslow, first black female graduate of the University of New Brunswick
Maurice Dean Wint, actor
Ken Wiwa, journalist and author, and son of executed Nigerian political prisoner Ken Saro-Wiwa
WondaGurl, record producer
Daniel Woodrow, comedian
Peter Worrell, NHL player

Y
Kevin Yarde, television meteorologist and politician
D'bi Young, dub poet
Marcia Young, CBC Radio broadcaster and host of The World This Hour
Tony "Master T" Young, MuchMusic
Hannan Younis, actress and comedian

See also
List of Canadians
Black Canadians in Montreal
Black Canadians in Ontario
Black Nova Scotians
Who's Who in Black Canada

Further reading

References

Black Canadians
 
Canadian
Black